Andre Roberts may refer to:

 Andre Roberts (mixed martial artist) (born 1965)
 Andre Roberts (American football) (born 1988)